WNAF may refer to:

 w-ary non-adjacent form (wNAF) in mathematics
 Western part of the North Anatolian Fault in geology
 Willie Nelson & Friends – Stars & Guitars, a music album
 Former call sign of the radio station WPVD (AM)